Kelly Cooper may refer to:

Kelly Cooper, Canadian short story writer, runner-up at the Danuta Gleed Literary Award
Kelly Cooper, fictional police constable in HolbyBlue
Kelly Cooper, Republican candidate in 2024 United States House of Representatives elections in Arizona#District 4